Robert Fenton Miles (24 January 1846 – 26 February 1930) was an English amateur cricketer who played first-class cricket from 1867 to 1879 for Oxford University and Gloucestershire County Cricket Club.  He was a right-handed batsman and a slow left arm orthodox bowler who made 69 first-class career appearances. Miles scored 577 runs with a highest score of 79.  He took 217 wickets with a best bowling analysis of 7/38.  He took five wickets in an innings on 15 occasions and twice took ten wickets in a match.

One of 10 children of the Reverend Robert Miles (1818–1883), he was the elder brother of both Frank Miles the artist and the Reverend Charles Oswald Miles.   Seven members of the family (three brothers, two cousins and an uncle) played first-class cricket in the Victorian era.   Miles married Bridget Hare, daughter of the Reverend Henry Bassano Hare, in 1874 and had three children.

References

1846 births
1930 deaths
English cricketers
English cricketers of 1864 to 1889
Gloucestershire cricketers
Oxford University cricketers
Alumni of Trinity College, Oxford